Minuscule 520 (in the Gregory-Aland numbering), ε 264 (in the Soden numbering), is a Greek minuscule manuscript of the New Testament, on parchment. Palaeographically it has been assigned to the 12th century. 
Scrivener labelled it by number 506. The manuscript has complex contents.

Description 

The codex contains the complete text of the four Gospels on 213 parchment leaves (size ). It is written in one column per page, 22-23 lines per page.

It contains lectionary markings at the margin (in red), incipits,  (lessons), Synaxarion, Menologion, and subscriptions at the end of each Gospel.
It is a beautiful little copy.

Text 

The Greek text of the codex is a representative of the Byzantine text-type. Aland placed it in Category V.
It was not examined by using the Claremont Profile Method.

History 

In 1727 the manuscript came from Constantinople to England and was presented to archbishop of Canterbury, William Wake, together with the manuscripts 73, 74, 506-519. Wake presented it to the Christ Church College in Oxford.

The manuscript was added to the list of New Testament minuscule manuscripts by F. H. A. Scrivener (506) and C. R. Gregory (520). Gregory saw it in 1883.

It is currently housed at the Christ Church (Wake 40) in Oxford.

See also 

 List of New Testament minuscules
 Biblical manuscript
 Textual criticism

References

Further reading

External links 

Greek New Testament minuscules
12th-century biblical manuscripts